Dähre is a municipality in the district Altmarkkreis Salzwedel, in Saxony-Anhalt, Germany. A section of the Salzwedeler Dumme river flows through it. Since 2009 it has incorporated the former municipalities of Bonese and Lagendorf.

References

Municipalities in Saxony-Anhalt
Altmarkkreis Salzwedel